Hasan Hatipoğlu (born 19 July 1989) is a Turkish professional footballer who plays as a defender for Pendikspor.

Career
Hatipoğlu spent most of his career in the amateur leagues of Turkey, with a brief stint in the Süper Lig with Balıkesirspor. Hatipoğlu made his professional debut with Balıkesirspor in a 2-2 Süper Lig tie with Eskişehirspor on 3 November 2014. In 2020, he helped BB Erzurumspor get promoted into the Süper Lig.

References

External links

1989 births
People from Alaşehir
Living people
Turkish footballers
Association football defenders
Afyonkarahisarspor footballers
Balıkesirspor footballers
Batman Petrolspor footballers
Boluspor footballers
Sivasspor footballers
Samsunspor footballers
Altınordu F.K. players
Büyükşehir Belediye Erzurumspor footballers
Kocaelispor footballers
Pendikspor footballers
Süper Lig players
TFF First League players
TFF Second League players